Goodenia argillacea is a species of flowering plant in the family Goodeniaceae and is endemic to the Northern Territory. It is a herb with an erect stem and weak, lying branches, oblong to linear leaves on the stems, and racemes of brownish-yellow flowers.

Description

Taxonomy and naming
Goodenia argillacea was first formally described in 1990 by Roger Charles Carolin in the journal Telopea from material he collected in 1974. The specific epithet (argillacea) means "pertaining to clay", referring to the habitat of the type specimens.

Distribution and habitat
This goodenia grows in Melaleuca scrub in heavy clay soil.

Conservation status
Goodenia argillaceais classified as "data deficient" under the Northern Territory Government Territory Parks and Wildlife Conservation Act 1976.

References

argillacea
Flora of the Northern Territory
Plants described in 1990
Taxa named by Roger Charles Carolin